Zekai Özger (January 8, 1948 – May 5, 1973), better known under his pen name Arkadaş Z. Özger, was a young Turkish poet.

Personal life
Zekai Özger was born on January 8, 1948, in Bursa, Turkey to a low-income family as the fifth child of seven siblings. His father Ali was a public worker and his mother Fahriye a homemaker. In his youth, he spent months in hospital due to bone disease he caught.

He was schooled in Altıparmak Primary School in Bursa. He then finished Atatürk High School in his hometown, and studied in the Journalism College at the Political Science of Ankara University. After graduating, Özger began to work as a film editor at the Turkish Radio and Television Corporation in Ankara.

One evening, he left his home, where he had no television set, to watch the broadcasting at the TV, he had co-worked. That night, he did not return home. In the morning hours of May 5, 1973, he was found dead in a street. The forensic autopsy showed no sign of injuries, but it stated death by cerebral hemorrhage. It was assumed that this could be the result of a severe head injury he had suffered during a police raid on the university campus in the chaotic era of March 12, 1971.

Poet
Özger began to write poems already in his highschool years, and continued during his higher education time and thenafter. Poetry was his entire world. He published his poems under the pen name Arkadaş Z. Özger. Arkadaş is the Turkish word for "friend".

His first poem, Tragedy of a beardless son, was published in 1967. Publication of his poems and writings continued to appear in the magazins Soyut, Forum, Papirüs, Yordam, Dost and Yansıma, as well as in the newspaper Ulus.

During his life, he had no opportunity to publish his works in a book. A year after his death, a collection of his poems that have been published in various newspapers and magazines, was gathered by his friends and published in a book titled Şiirler ("Poems") by Nadas in 1974. This book's expanded second edition was released under the title Sevdadır ("It's Love") by Mayıs Publishing. The poetry book of Özger has reached its 6th edition in an expanded version.

Özger has not been open about his sexuality, or for which any reliable sources exist, except for some of his works that imply indirectly about his homosexual tendencies, such as Love Zeki Muren (Turkish homosexual singer), Oh, tender son, The soul loves soul, There is nothing beyond this or a poem named Hello!, my dear.

Legacy
The Mayıs Publishing created an award in honor of Arkadaş Z. Özger in 1996. The award is given annually on his death anniversary to a selected literary work of Turkish literature.

Winners of "Arkadaş Z. Özger Poetry Award"
 1996 Gazanfer Eryüksel - Yücelay Sal
 1997 Zeynep Köylü - Hüseyin Peker
 1998 Serap Erdoğan - Hüseyin Köse
 1999 Kuvvet Yurdakul
 2000 Sadık Yaşar
 2001 Mehmet Kâzım - Bâki Asiltürk
 2002 Bir Şiiri İnceleme by Bahtiyar Kaymak
 2003 Nesrin Kültür Kiraz
 2004 Ertuğrul Deveci
 2005 Cuma Duymaz - Sinan Oruçoğlu
 2006 Hayriye Ersöz
 2007 Ersun Çıplak
 2008 Bir Şiiri İnceleme by Halil İbrahim Özbay
 2009 Nurullah Kuzu
 2010 Gökhan Arslan
 2011  Hayati Çitaklar
 2012 Murat Acar
 2013 Turgut Uyar’ın ‘Geyikli Gece’ Şiiri Üzerine Bir İnceleme by Şerif Mehmet Uğurlu

On 5 May 2010, a "Poet Arkadaş Z. Özger Meeting" was organized in Ankara during the 5th "International Meeting Against Homophobia" for the first time.

References

1948 births
People from Bursa
Ankara University Faculty of Political Sciences alumni
Turkish poets
1973 deaths
20th-century poets